Plug Research is an independent record label, based in Los Angeles, California, US.
Created by Allen Avanessian in 1994, the label specialized in IDM, folktronica and experimental music.

The label began with young artists that have made its reputation, such as Exile, Bilal, Flying Lotus, Daedelus, and Dntel. Today he continues his new selection of quality artists like Tensei, Shortcircles or Astrobal.
Andrew Lojero was Senior A&R Director and Executive Producer for Plug Research from 2008 to 2012.

Artists
Adult Karate
Adventure Time
Amp Live
Anthony Valadez
Astrobal
Bilal
Chessie
Daedelus
Damon Aaron
Dntel
Jeremy Dower
Flying Lotus
Headset
John Tejada
Shafiq Husayn
Meanest Man Contest
Mia Doi Todd
Milosh
Nobody
Naytronix
Om'Mas Keith
Roommate
SONNYMOON
Sene
Soulo
Thomas Fehlmann
The Woods

See also 
 List of record labels
 List of electronic music record labels

References

External links
 Official site
 

American independent record labels
Electronic music record labels
Experimental music record labels